Moses Hardy Nickerson (September 10, 1844 – March 23, 1943) was a journalist, poet and political figure in Nova Scotia, Canada. He represented Shelburne County in the Nova Scotia House of Assembly from 1902 to 1911 as a Liberal member.

He was born in Newellton, Shelburne County, Nova Scotia, the son of Phineas Nickerson and Jane Smith. In 1868, Nickerson married Mary E. Duncan. Nickerson was a school teacher for 15 years, a court interpreter and the editor of the Cape Sable Advertiser. He was first elected to the provincial assembly in a 1902 by-election held after the death of Thomas Robertson. He was the author of Songs of Summerland and Carols of the Coast. Nickerson helped found the Fisherman's Union of Nova Scotia in 1905. He died in Melrose, Massachusetts at the age of 96.

His son Maurice also served in the provincial assembly.

References 
 A Directory of the Members of the Legislative Assembly of Nova Scotia, 1758-1958, Public Archives of Nova Scotia (1958)

1846 births
1943 deaths
Nova Scotia Liberal Party MLAs
19th-century Canadian poets
Canadian male poets
19th-century Canadian male writers